Diaso Senior High School is a co-educational day/ boarding second cycle school situated in Diaso in the  Upper Denkyira district in Central Region of Ghana.

Courses 
The school offers courses in General Science, General Arts, Business, Home Economics and Agriculture.

References 

High schools in Ghana
Central Region (Ghana)
Educational institutions established in 1991
1991 establishments in Ghana